is a town located in Kushiro Subprefecture, Hokkaido, Japan. In September 2016, it had an estimated population of 7,631 and an area of 774.53 km2.

Tourist attractions in the town include Lake Mashū (Ainu: Kamuy-to), Lake Kussharo (Ainu: Kutcar or Kutcaro) and Kawayu Onsen.

History 
1923: Teshikaga Village is formed.
1947: Teshikaga Village becomes Techikaga Town.

Climate

Notable people from Teshikaga 
Taiho Koki - sumo wrestler (born on Sakhalin but moved to Teshikaga aged 5)
Kotogatake Koichi - sumo wrestler

Gallery

References

External links

Official Website 

Towns in Hokkaido